Sukra Raj Sonyok Limbu (Nepali: शुक्रराज संयोक लिम्बु; born 22 December 1936) is a Nepalese politician and former Member of Parliament in Nepal. He was born to a Limbu (Songyokpa) family in Taplejung, Eastern Nepal. He served as a Member of National Assembly from 1997 to 2004. During his term in parliament he had served as a Chief Whip of Nepali Congress (Democratic) from 2003 to 2004.
He ran for House of Representatives of Nepal in 1991 from Taplejung Constituency - 2 on behalf of Nepali Congress. He also contested for Member of Constitution Assembly on 2010 from Morang Constituency - 2. He played an active role in arm uprising in 1974 (2031 B.S.) as a local commander of Congress Mukti Sena (Liberation Army) of Nepali Congress. Before he joined Nepalese Politics, he was aBritish Gurkha Army (1954AD–1970AD). He served as Serjeant(no:-21140931) in Queen's Gurkha Engineers Unit of the British Army.

See also
 National Assembly of Nepal
 Elections in Nepal
 Limbu people
 Limbuwan
 Brigade of Gurkhas

References

External links
 Gurkha Museum
 Land of Gurkhas, a video footage from 1957
 British Gurkha Welfare Society
 Gurkhas - World of Valor (Documentary)

1936 births
Living people
Members of the National Assembly (Nepal)
People from Taplejung District
Limbu people
Gurkhas